The Football League play-offs for the 2001–02 season were held in May 2002, with the finals taking place at Millennium Stadium in Cardiff. The play-off semi-finals will be played over two legs and will be contested by the teams who finish in 3rd, 4th, 5th and 6th place in the Football League First Division and Football League Second Division and the 4th, 5th, 6th and 7th placed teams in the Football League Third Division table. The winners of the semi-finals will go through to the finals, with the winner of the matches gaining promotion for the following season.

Background
The Football League play-offs have been held every year since 1987. They take place for each division following the conclusion of the regular season and are contested by the four clubs finishing below the automatic promotion places.

In the First Division, Wolverhampton Wanderers, who were aiming to return to the top flight after nearly 20 years, finished 3 points behind their Black Country rivals West Bromwich Albion, who finished second and thus gained automatic promotion. Albion ended the season 10 points behind champions Manchester City, who returned to the Premier League after being relegated the previous season.
Millwall who were aiming for a place in the top flight for the first time since 1990, finished in fourth place in the table.
Birmingham City, who were aiming to return to the top flight for the first time since 1986, finished in fifth place.
Norwich City finished 1 point behind Birmingham City and were looking for a place back in the Premiership for the first time since 1995.

First Division

Semi-finals
First leg

Second leg

Norwich City won 3–2 on aggregate.

Birmingham City won 2–1 on aggregate.

Final

Second Division

Semi-finals
First leg

Second leg

Brentford won 2–1 on aggregate.

Stoke City won 3–2 on aggregate.

Final

Third Division

Semi-finals
First leg

Second leg

Cheltenham Town 2–2 Hartlepool United on aggregate. Cheltenham Town won 5–4 on penalties.

Rushden & Diamonds won 4–3 on aggregate.

Final

External links
Football League website

 
English Football League play-offs
play-offs
May 2002 sports events in the United Kingdom